Koopa Troopas, known in Japan as , are fictional footsoldiers of the turtle-like Koopa race from the Mario media franchise. They are commonly referred to generically as Koopas, a race that includes Bowser, King of the Koopas, the Koopalings, Lakitu, and others. 

Predecessors to Koopa Troopas, appeared in the 1983 game Mario Bros., with Koopa Troopas debuting in the first Super Mario game, Super Mario Bros. (1985). Koopa Troopas have appeared in some form in most of the Super Mario games and many of the spin-off games. When defeated, they may flee from or retreat inside their shells, which can usually be used as weapons. Koopa shells are a recurring weapon in the franchise, particularly popularized in the Mario Kart series, in which they can be fired as projectiles against other racers.

Concept and creation

A tortoise-like enemy called Shellcreepers (simply called "turtles" in Japan) first appeared in the 1983 arcade game Mario Bros., set in the sewers of New York. Series creator Shigeru Miyamoto had a fellow designer draw the enemy, but the result was far too realistic to fit in with the tone of the game, so Miyamoto designed the enemy himself. While the design had quite a large head, Miyamoto validated it by suggesting it looked like a tortoise. In Mario Bros., Shellcreepers could only be defeated by hitting the platform on which they stood from underneath, thus flipping them on their backs allowing Mario or Luigi to kick them off the screen. In Mario Bros., the color of a Shellcreeper's shell indicated how fast it was - green being the slowest, purple being faster, and red being the fastest. 

Koopa Troopas ("Nokonoko" in Japan), named as such in 1985's Super Mario Bros. for the Nintendo Entertainment System, are the troops in Bowser's (known as "Koopa" in Japan) army. 

The design of the Koopa Paratroopa ( in Japan), a Koopa Troopa with wings which jumps up and down or flies, came from Mario developer Takashi Tezuka in an attempt to add a flying character to Super Mario Bros., but there was not enough space to include such a character. Tezuka suggested that they put wings on the Koopa Troopa, which Miyamoto did not think would work. However, once it was finished, Miyamoto felt that it looked cute.

Appearances

Super Mario

In Super Mario Bros., green-shelled Troopas wander aimlessly along platforms and even fall into pits, whereas those with red shells patrol their platforms, turning around when they reach the edge of it. Jumping on a Koopa Troopa causes it to retreat into its shell. The shell can then be kicked, causing it to slide quickly along a platform, defeating any enemy in its path (or Mario, should he stand in its way). It may also rebound off a block, pipe, or any non-enemy (or player) solid object that is in its way. These attributes have been present throughout most of the games. Super Mario Bros. also introduced the Koopa Paratroopa. Jumping on a Paratroopa causes it to lose its wings and become a normal Koopa Troopa.

Koopa Troopas appeared again in Super Mario Bros.: The Lost Levels, originally a Japan-exclusive Famicom Disk System title released in 1986 as Super Mario Bros. 2.

In Super Mario World for the Super NES, the Koopa Troopa's design was changed slightly, as it was given shoes according to the color of its shell and made bipedal, and although quadrupedal Koopas would be seen in Super Mario Land (albeit as  - which were similar to Koopa Troopas except their shells exploded) and its sequel, they would not be seen again until Super Mario Galaxy and its sequel, with bipedal Koopas remaining the most common design throughout the series. Super Mario World also introduced the concept of knocking a Koopa Troopa out of its shell by jumping on it (something outside the anatomy of real turtles and tortoises), causing it to go in search of a new shell. The game also introduced blue and yellow Koopa Troopas; blue Troopas essentially being faster versions of red ones that kick their shells at the player when knocked out of them, and yellow Koopas chasing after the player character. The New Super Mario Bros. series saw the return of blue-shelled Troopas, but here they drop a blue shell after their death that the player character can wear, giving the player character the abilities of a Koopa Troopa such as retreating into the shell, which can be kicked by another player.

They also appear in Super Mario Maker and Super Mario Maker 2.

They appear in Super Mario Odyssey, where for the most part they're friendly mini-game organizers who give a Power Moon to Mario for beating them in a race after finishing the main game, similar to Koopa the Quick in "Super Mario 64", or walking on a shape formed by arrows that disappear over time. Here the only Koopas that are part of the Koopa Army are the ones found in the 8-bit inspired sections reminiscent of the first Super Mario Bros or the ones who throw hammers and pans in certain parts of the game in 3D where they can be controlled through Cappy to eliminate enemies from longer distances or to jump higher.

Spin-off games

Mario Kart

Super Mario Kart for the Super NES marked the Koopa Troopa's first appearance as a playable character, as well as introducing the character to the Mario spin-off games. Although Koopa Troopa was replaced by Wario on the roster of Mario Kart 64, he would return as a playable character again in later games like Mario Kart: Double Dash, Mario Kart Wii, Mario Kart 7, Mario Kart 8, Mario Kart 8 Deluxe, and Mario Kart Tour. Since then, both Koopas and Paratroopas have appeared, either playable or not, in a vast number of spin-off games in the series, and Koopa shells have become popularized as a weapon by the Mario Kart series. Reflecting the walking behavior of Koopa Troopas in the Super Mario games, green shells move in a straight line regardless of what is around them, and red shells move intelligently to increase the chance of hitting an opponent.

Super Smash Bros.

They appear in all games of the Super Smash Bros. series, appearing as background elements, stage hazards, trophies, and adventure mode enemies. The Koopa shell has appeared as a weapon in every Super Smash Bros. game.

Mario sports games

Koopa Troopas also have appeared in Mario Golf and Mario Tennis. Koopa Troopa also appears in Mario Tennis Aces as a playable character.

Mario Party

A friendly Koopa was given the role of the host of Mario Party for the Nintendo 64. He also appears in Mario Party 4, Mario Party 8, Mario Party 9, Super Mario Party and Mario Party Superstars.

In other media
Koopa Troopas have also made appearances in the various cartoons and comics based on the Super Mario series. While members of the Koopa family appear in the 1993 Super Mario Bros. film, Troopas do not, although early artwork had the film's version of Goombas labelled as "Koopa's Troopas".

Koopas will be appearing in The Super Mario Bros. Movie as part of Bowser's army.

Toys to life

Koopa Troopa also has its own Amiibo along with Goomba. They appear in the Wii U version of Skylanders: SuperChargers, being summoned by Bowser during one of his special moves.

Reception
GameDaily listed Koopa Troopa as the eighth best Mario enemy, calling them the most common enemies in the series next to the Goomba. IGN's Audrey Drake listed Koopa Troopa as one of the best Mario enemies, saying that it is one of the most "iconic Mario enemies out there. In fact, they're pretty much synonymous with the franchise."

Since their introduction, Koopa Troopas have become the iconic enemy of the Mario franchise, often referenced in popular culture relating to the series: in 2007's The Simpsons Game, a Koopa Troopa appears as the apparent bride of the eccentric geek Professor Frink after Bart and Lisa rescue him from Donkey Kong in a parody of the popular arcade game. A satirical article was written by The Pitt News columnist Ben Korman, criticizing the Mario series for its offensive treatment of the Koopa Troopas, stating that the character Mario was rewarded for his slaughter of "innocent, healthy turtles".

A variety of Mario-related merchandise depicting Koopa Troopas have been produced over the years by Nintendo; this merchandise includes plush dolls, mini figures, bottle caps and plush keychains. The various merchandise given out on King Koopa's Kool Kartoons was often adorned with the name Koopa Troopa as well. Their signature shell was included as a player piece in the Nintendo version of the Monopoly board game.

Notes

References

External links
Koopa Troopa at MarioWiki.com

Anthropomorphic video game characters
Animal characters in video games
Fictional monsters
Fictional turtles
Fictional warrior races
Mario (franchise) enemies
Video game characters introduced in 1983
Video game species and races
Fictional henchmen in video games